Cù Huy Cận (May 31, 1919 – February 19, 2005) was a Vietnamese poet. He was a close friend of Xuân Diệu, another famous poet. His first collection of poems, Sacred Fire, was published in 1938. His son is Cù Huy Hà Vũ, legal scholar and dissident. After the Vietnam Revolution, his style changed drastically.

References

Vietnamese male poets
2005 deaths
1919 births
20th-century Vietnamese poets
20th-century male writers